Guaynia was the territory that stretched along the southern coast of Puerto Rico in the pre-Columbian era. The Taino cacique (tribal chief) Agüeybaná ruled the area around Guayanilla when Christopher Columbus landed in Puerto Rico in 1493.

References

Geography of Puerto Rico